Phragmidium mucronatum is a plant pathogen that causes rose rust.

References

Fungal plant pathogens and diseases
Rose diseases
Pucciniales
Fungi described in 1790
Taxa named by Christiaan Hendrik Persoon